is an Omuro Shingon temple in Takamatsu, Kagawa Prefecture, Japan. The provincial temple of former Sanuki Province and Temple 80 on the Shikoku 88 temple pilgrimage, it is said to have been founded by Gyōki in 741. The main image is of Senjū Kannon. The area has been designated a Special Historic Site.

Buildings
 Hondō (late-Kamakura period); 5x5 bay, single-storey, irimoya-zukuri, tiled-roof; (Important Cultural Property)

Treasures
 Wooden statue of Senjū Kannon (late-Heian to Muromachi period) (Important Cultural Property)
 Bell (Heian period) (ICP)
 Manirintō or 'dismounting stone' (City-designated Cultural Property)

Excavations
Between 1983 and 1991 investigations uncovered remains of the axially-arranged Chūmon, Kon-dō, and Kōdō.

Museum
A museum exhibits finds from the site.

See also

 Provincial temple
 Shikoku 88 temple pilgrimage
 List of Special Places of Scenic Beauty, Special Historic Sites and Special Natural Monuments
List of Historic Sites of Japan (Kagawa)

References

External links
  Sanuki Kokubun-ji

Buddhist temples in Kagawa Prefecture
Buddhist pilgrimage sites in Japan
Museums in Kagawa Prefecture
Special Historic Sites
Important Cultural Properties of Japan